Pomaderris cotoneaster, commonly known as cotoneaster pomaderris, is a species of flowering plant in the family Rhamnaceae and is endemic to south-eastern continental Australia. It is an erect shrub with woolly-hairy stems, elliptic leaves, and leafy panicles of cream-coloured flowers.

Description
Flowering occurs in October and November.

Taxonomy
Pomaderris cotoneaster was first formally described in 1951 by Norman Arthur Wakefield in The Victorian Naturalist from specimens he collected near the Upper Genoa River in 1950. The specific epithet (cotoneaster) means "quince-likeness".

Distribution and habitat
This pomaderris grows in forest and woodland, often along rivers or on cliffs and is found from near Mittagong in New South Wales to the upper Genoa River in far north-east Victoria, but is rare in both states.

Conservation status
Cotoneaster pomaderris is listed as "endangered" under the Australian Government Environment Protection and Biodiversity Conservation Act 1999, the Victorian Government Flora and Fauna Guarantee Act 1988 and the New South Wales Government Biodiversity Conservation Act 2016. The main threats to the species include climate change, grazing by herbivores, and weed invasion.

References

Flora of New South Wales
Flora of Victoria (Australia)
cotoneaster
Taxa named by Norman Arthur Wakefield
Plants described in 1951